Bolton Association F.C. was an English association football club from Bolton in Lancashire.  The Association was part of the club name, rather than a descriptor for the code the team played.

History

The club was founded in 1883 by a Mr J. Walker of the Bolton Cricket Club, who became the club's captain, as a contrast to the illegal professionalism of Bolton Wanderers.  The club started as a side "solely for the recreation to be obtained from its pursuit, and not with the exclusive determination to win at all hazards which actuates the management of the other organisation"; when trying to recruit players, the club relied on persuasion rather than "inducement", an attitude contrasting with a local unnamed club offering 5 shillings per win and half-a-crown per defeat.

The quixotic nature of such an approach, and the change in the nature of the game, were shown up almost instantly; although the Association beat Cambridge University 2-1 at home at Christmas 1883 and Chorley by 10 goals to 1 a month before, it lost 3-2 at home to minnows Enfield in the first round of the Lancashire Cup, 7-1 at Notts County, 6-1 at Preston North End, 11-0 at Great Lever (despite playing with 13 men), and 12-2 at Blackburn Olympic.   At the end of the club's first season, one of their better players, George Dobson, left the club to become a professional at Bolton Wanderers.  Walker had the consolation of representing the Lancashire FA, called up as a reserve in late 1883 for a match against the Sheffield FA.

Despite the club's adherence to amateurism, the club was part of a proposed breakaway group, the British Football Association, which agitated for professionalism.  It proved counter to the club's hopes for a successful side and the last references to the club are in 1891 playing junior football.

FA Cup

The club entered the FA Cup in 1883-84 and 1884-85.  In the first entry, the club easily beat Bradshaw 5-1 in the first round, and was considered to have done well to restrict Bolton Wanderers to three goals in the second round, especially as the forward Sowerbutts was "rendered almost useless by a violent charge early in the game".

The following season the club got a walkover in the first round, scheduled opponents Astley Bridge withdrawing after the Lancashire FA fell out with the Football Association over professionalism, but in the second round an "indifferent" team lost 7-2 at Darwen Old Wanderers.

References

Defunct football clubs in England
Defunct football clubs in Lancashire
Association football clubs established in 1883
Association football clubs disestablished in the 19th century